Eugen York (26 November 1912 – 18 November 1991) was a German film director. He directed 35 films between 1938 and 1984. He was born in Rybinsk, Russian Empire and died in Berlin, Germany.

Selected filmography

Film
 Morituri (1948)
 The Last Night (1949)
 Shadows in the Night (1950)
 Blondes for Export (1950)
  (1950)
 The Allure of Danger (1950)
 Das Fräulein von Scuderi (1955)
 A Heart Returns Home (1956)
 The Heart of St. Pauli (1957)
 The Copper (1958)
 Man in the River (1958)
  (1958)
 Murderer in the Fog (1964)
  (1977)

Television
 Das Sparschwein (1952)
 Aufruhr (1960) — based on the play Disturbance by Hugh Forbes
 Polly liebt nur Kapitäne (1963)
 Haus der Schönheit (1963) — based on the play Pariser Platz 13 by Vicki Baum
  (1964–1966, TV series, 26 episodes)
 Sechs Stunden Angst (1964) — based on the novel Six heures d'angoisse by 
  (1966) — based on a radio play by 
 Spätsommer (1966) — based on the novel Altersschwach by 
 Das kleine Teehaus (co-director: Paul Martin, 1967) — based on The Teahouse of the August Moon
  (1967–1968, TV series, 8 episodes)
 Der Tag, an dem die Kinder verschwanden (1967) — based on The Day the Children Vanished by Hugh Pentecost
  (1969–1970, TV series, 12 episodes)
  (1969, TV series, 6 episodes)
 Der Opernball (1971) — based on Der Opernball
 Kennzeichen Rosa Nelke (1971, TV series, 6 episodes)
 Ball im Savoy (1971) — based on Ball im Savoy
  (1973) — based on Paganini
 Gräfin Mariza (1974) — based on Countess Maritza
 Madame Pompadour (1974) — based on Madame Pompadour
 Glückliche Reise (1975) — based on 
 Viktoria und ihr Husar (1975) — based on Viktoria und ihr Husar
 Frau Luna (1975) — based on 
 Hatschi! (1979)
 Und plötzlich bist du draußen (1981)
  (co-director: Rolf von Sydow, 1982)
 Ein Fall für zwei: Zwielicht (1983, TV series episode)
 Ein Fall für zwei: Herr Pankratz, bitte! (1983, TV series episode)
 Ein Fall für zwei: Chemie eines Mordes (1984, TV series episode)

References

External links

1912 births
1991 deaths
People from Rybinsk
German mass media people
German film directors
Emigrants from the Russian Empire to Germany